The January 1999 Mineriad was led by miners in Romania against low wages under the leadership of Miron Cozma in January 1999. Protesters marched onto Bucharest and other cities, demonstrating the government's wage policies and low wages, demanding an increase of the wages and better working conditions in the country.

History
The Jiu Valley miners left again for Bucharest, unhappy with the governmental reduction of the subsidies, which would result in the closing of the mines. The barricade installed by the gendarmes at Costești was crossed by the miners. Near Râmnicu Vâlcea, a Gendarmerie unit was ambushed by the miners. After reaching Râmnicu Vâlcea, they sequestered the prefect of Vâlcea County. Radu Vasile, prime minister at the time, negotiated an agreement with Miron Cozma, the miners' leader, at the nearby Cozia Monastery.

On 14 February 1999, Cozma was found guilty for organizing the mineriad and he was sentenced for 18 years in prison. The miners led by Cozma left for Bucharest to attempt another mineriad, but this time, they were stopped by the police at Stoenești, Olt County. In the clash that followed, 100 policemen and 70 miners were wounded and one miner died. Cozma was arrested and sent to a prison in Rahova.

References

Mineriads
Protests in Romania
1999 in Romania
History of Romania (1989–present)
History of Bucharest
Jiu Valley
Riots and civil disorder in Romania
1999 riots
January 1999 events in Europe